The 2002 Canada Cup (known as the Government of Canada Cup for sponsorship reasons) was the 5th edition of the Canadian Professional Soccer League's league cup tournament running from late June through late September. Ottawa Wizards successfully defended the title after defeating Toronto Croatia 1-0 at Cove Road Stadium in London, Ontario. The format of the competition changed with the introduction of a qualifying round with a home and away two-game series instead of the traditional group stage format previously used by the league. The tournament received a title sponsor from the government of Canada after the league received a federal grant of $100,000. The original hosting rights were granted to Hamilton, but after failing to successfully organize the tournament the responsibilities were given to London, which in return received a wild card match privilege. The decision to grant London the hosting rights produced controversy as originally Ottawa was selected by the CPSL executives to replace Hamilton, but was vetoed by the team owners as London was deemed more of reliable venue.

First round

Quarter-final

Wild card

Semi-final

Final

References 

CPSL Canada Cup
CPSL Canada Cup
CPSL Canada Cup